Max Rodenbeck (born 1962) is a British/American journalist and author based in Delhi . He is South Asia Bureau Chief for The Economist magazine, where he has written on international affairs for more than 30 years. He was previously The Economist's Middle East Bureau Chief in Cairo from 2000-2015. He is the author of the critically acclaimed Cairo: The City Victorious, regarded as one of the best single-volume biographies of the city available, and is a contributor to the New York Review of Books,  the New York Times  and Foreign Policy magazine. He has been described as "one of the foremost experts on today’s Middle East".

Early life and education 
Max Rodenbeck was born in Charlottesville, Virginia to a British mother and American father. His family moved to Cairo when he was 2 years old, and he was raised between Egypt, Britain and the US. Following boarding school in Massachusetts, he studied Arabic and Islamic History at the American University in Cairo.

Writing

Journalism 
Rodenbeck started writing in the English-language press in Egypt in the 1980s, and also contributed to a number of tour guides such as the Insight series volumes on Cairo, Egypt and The Nile. He began covering Egypt and the Middle East as a stringer for The Economist in 1988, while also writing as a freelancer for the Financial Times, Middle East International, The Cairo Times and numerous other publications.
In 2000 he was appointed Middle East Bureau Chief for The Economist, covering the region from Iran to Morocco. During his 15  years in the post he covered events ranging from the toppling of Saddam Hussein and the US occupation of Iraq, to the failed revolutions of 2009 in Iran, and the Arab Spring in 2011. Notably, Rodenbeck's reportage in 2010 correctly predicted the eruption of the Arab Spring. Since January 2016 he has been South Asia Bureau Chief for The Economist, based in Delhi.

Cairo: The City Victorious 
Rodenbeck's historical portrait of Egypt's capital, Cairo: The City Victorious, was first published by Picador in the UK, and Alfred A. Knopf in New York, where it met wide critical acclaim. The work "traces the life of Cairo from birth...through the heights of medieval splendor, and on to the present day". In its review of the book, The Washington Post Book World described 'Cairo' as "an enormously entertaining read… Rodenbeck's lively and affectionate portrait…veers easily between past and present, personal and historical." The book was cited as "a book to read" by the New York Review of Books, as one of the five best travel books of the year by The Sunday Times, and "the most authoritative and entertaining read on the convoluted and picturesque 1000-year history of the Egyptian capital” by Lonely Planet.Cairo: The City Victorious has since been translated into eight languages.

Media Appearances and Fellowships 
Rodenbeck has been interviewed on Charlie Rose, with Christiane Amanpour on CNN, on National Public Radio (NPR), The Wire (India), as well as The Economist Radio, and  podcasts such as The Arabist.
Rodenbeck has also been a regular panelist at the annual Jaipur Literary Festival in Rajasthan, India, and was a visiting fellow at the Woodrow Wilson International Center for Scholars in Washington DC in 2015.

References

American male journalists
Journalists from Cairo
The Economist people
Living people
Books about Egypt
1962 births